The Bayer designation Omega Cygni (ω Cyg / ω Cygni) is shared by two star systems, in the constellation Cygnus:
ω¹ Cygni
ω² Cygni

Cygni, Omega
Cygnus (constellation)